Li Weijia (born 4 November 1976) also named Vega. He is a Chinese host and actor. He is the co-host of the TV program Happy Camp which airs on Hunan Satellite TV with fellow hosts He Jiong, Xie Na, Du Haitao, and Wu Xin.

Biography
Li was born in Changsha, Hunan on November 4, 1976. He is a graduate of Communication University of Zhejiang.

Works

TV Series

Film

Animated film

References

1976 births
Male actors from Changsha
Communication University of Zhejiang alumni
Living people
Male actors from Hunan
Chinese male voice actors
Chinese male film actors
Chinese male television actors